Carlos Horst Fuldner (December 16, 1910 – 1992) was an Argentine born Nazi and businessman. He served as a captain in the SS during World War II, at one point as a translator for the Blue Division, and after the war worked with Rodolfo Freude to setup ratlines to assist fleeing Nazis get to South America and find employment.  Notable individuals he assisted included Adolf Eichman who was employed by his CAPRI hydroelectric construction firm.

References 

SS officers
Nazis in South America
Argentine people of German descent
1910 births
1992 deaths

Adolf Eichmann